Under the Influence: A Tribute to the Legends of Hard Rock is the second EP by British rock band Asking Alexandria. It was released on 28 November 2012 by Sumerian Records and contains several covers of hard rock bands' songs as well as an original song titled "Run Free." "Run Free" was released as a single from the EP.

Track listing

Personnel
Asking Alexandria
 Danny Worsnop – lead vocals, keyboards, programming
 Ben Bruce – lead guitar, backing vocals, keyboards, programming
 Cameron Liddell – rhythm guitar
 Sam Bettley – bass
 James Cassells – drums

Additional personnel
 Joey Sturgis – production on track 5

References

2012 EPs
Asking Alexandria albums
Sumerian Records albums